Robert Burnett was a naval officer.

Robert Burnett may also refer to:

Robert Meyer Burnett (born 1967), filmmaker and DVD producer
Rob Burnett (American football) (born 1967), former defensive end
Rob Burnett (producer) (born 1962), producer, director and writer
Bobby Burnett (1943–2016), American football player
Sir Robert Burnett, 5th Baronet (died 1759) of the Burnett baronets
Sir Robert Burnett, 7th Baronet (1755–1837) of the Burnett baronets
Sir Robert Burnett, 11th Baronet (1833–1894) of the Burnett baronets

See also
Robert Burnet, Lord Crimond (1592–1661)
Burnett (surname)